AIDS photo diary, 1986–1990 is an art work that comprises a photo diary that records the decline in health and eventual death of David Tosh, from AIDS from 1986 to 1990 in Sydney, Australia. The diary – with accompanying photographs taken by John Jenner – was created by Jenner to remember his friend and honour the lives of people living with HIV/AIDS. Some of the images were featured in an article in Sydney Morning Heralds Good Weekend magazine, 13 October 1990, pp. 20–29.

Contents
The work includes photographs by John Jenner from 1986 to 1990, together with a biography in the form of a play written by Jenner.  The diary also includes poems by Willy Barber.

Context
This diary was one of a number of artistic responses to HIV/AIDS in Australia at a time when medications that could prolong and enhance the quality of life of those living with HIV had not been developed. David Tosh died on 3 May 1990 aged 30 years. In 1990 Australia experienced 2381 cases of AIDS as reported by the National Centre in HIV Epidemiology and Clinical Research. 97% of these cases were male and the survival rate was only 40%.

The diary was exhibited in the 100 Objects Exhibition at the State Library of New South Wales in 2010.

References

Diaries
HIV/AIDS in literature